Abel Makkonen Tesfaye (born February 16, 1990), known professionally as the Weeknd, is a Canadian singer, songwriter, and actor. Known for his sonic versatility and dark lyricism, his music explores escapism, romance, and melancholia, and is often inspired by personal experiences. His accolades include four Grammy Awards, twenty Billboard Music Awards, twenty-two Juno Awards, six American Music Awards, two MTV Video Music Awards, a Latin Grammy Award, and nominations for an Academy Award and a Primetime Emmy Award.

Born and raised in Toronto, Ontario, Tesfaye began his career in 2009 by anonymously releasing music on YouTube. Two years later, he co-founded the XO record label and released the mixtapes House of Balloons, Thursday and Echoes of Silence, which gained recognition for his style of contemporary and alternative R&B and the mystique surrounding his identity. In 2012, he signed with Republic Records and rereleased the mixtapes in the compilation album Trilogy. He explored dark wave in his debut studio album Kiss Land (2013), which debuted at number two on the US Billboard 200. After its release, Tesfaye began contributing to film soundtracks, with his acclaimed single "Earned It" from Fifty Shades of Grey (2015) winning the Grammy Award for Best R&B Performance, while also being nominated for the Academy Award for Best Original Song.

Tesfaye earned critical and commercial success with his pop-leaning second album Beauty Behind the Madness (2015), which reached number one in the US, contained the US Billboard Hot 100 chart-topping singles "Can't Feel My Face" and "The Hills", and won the Grammy Award for Best Urban Contemporary Album and was nominated for Album of the Year. His trap-infused third studio album Starboy (2016) saw similar commercial success and included the US number-one single of the same name and "Die For You", and won the Grammy Award for Best Urban Contemporary Album. Tesfaye explored new wave and dream pop with his critically acclaimed fourth studio album After Hours (2020), which featured the chart record-setting single "Blinding Lights" and the US number-one singles "Heartless" and "Save Your Tears". His dance-pop inspired fifth album Dawn FM (2022) included the US top-ten single "Take My Breath".

Among the world's best-selling music artists with over 75 million records sold, Tesfaye holds several streaming and Billboard chart records. He is the first artist to simultaneously debut on the top three on Hot R&B/Hip-Hop Songs, while "Blinding Lights" is ranked as the greatest Hot 100 song in Billboard history. Often considered as a prominent figure in contemporary popular music, Tesfaye was listed by Time as one of the world's most influential people in 2020. An advocate for racial equality and food security, he was appointed a World Food Programme Goodwill Ambassador in 2021.

Early life
Abel Makkonen Tesfaye was born on February 16, 1990, in Toronto, Ontario. He is the only child of Ethiopian immigrants Makkonen Tesfaye and Samrawit Hailu, who separated shortly after his birth. He was brought up was what then the city of Scarborough by his mother and grandmother. He has an estranged relationship with his father, in which he explained to Rolling Stone, "I saw him vaguely when I was six, and then again when I was 11 or 12, and he had a new family and kids. I don't even know where he lived — I'd see him for, like, a night. I'm sure he's a great guy. I never judged him. He wasn't abusive, he wasn't an alcoholic, he wasn't an asshole. He just wasn't there."

Tesfaye was raised as an Ethiopian Orthodox. When asked whether or not he was still religious, he stated to Variety in 2020, "I dunno...everything is a test, and if you are religious or spiritual, you have to go through things." His native language is Amharic, which he learned through his grandmother. He later became fluent in French by attending a French-immersion school. He was further educated at West Hill Collegiate Institute and Birchmount Park Collegiate Institute.

When he was 17, Tesfaye dropped out of school and moved to an apartment in the neighbourhood of Parkdale with two friends; including his best friend and now creative director La Mar Taylor. He has described this period as being like the 1995 film Kids "without the AIDS", as they lived a hedonistic lifestyle. He has also experienced homelessness and was incarcerated on several occasions during this time, which encouraged him to "smarten up, to focus."

Tesfaye often used drugs and abused illegal substances such as ketamine, cocaine, MDMA, magic mushrooms, and cough syrup. In December 2016, he stated that drugs were a "crutch" for him when it came to writing music. In August 2021, during a cover story with GQ, he described himself as being "sober lite", meaning that he has stopped using drugs with the exception of marijuana. He also noted that he drinks alcohol occasionally, stating: "I'm not a heavy drinker, as much as I used to be. The romance of drinking isn't there."

Career

2009–2011: Early beginnings

In August 2009, Tesfaye began anonymously releasing music on YouTube. The following year, he met Jeremy Rose, a producer who had an idea for a dark contemporary R&B project. After initially trying to pitch the idea to musician Curtis Santiago, Rose played one of his instrumentals for Tesfaye, who freestyle rapped over it. Rose produced three songs – "What You Need", "Loft Music" and "The Party & The After Party" – and others that Tesfaye had sung on, which were ultimately scrapped. Rose let Tesfaye keep the tracks he had produced under the condition that he would be credited for them. In December 2010, Tesfaye uploaded "What You Need", "Loft Music" and "The Morning" to YouTube under the username "xoxxxoooxo". His identity was initially unknown. The songs drew some attention online, and were later included in a blog post from rapper Drake. The songs subsequently received coverage from various media outlets, including Pitchfork and The New York Times.

Before adopting the stage name the Weeknd, Tesfaye released music under the aliases the Noise and Kin Kane. His current stage name was chosen in tribute to when he dropped out of school, took his mattress, "left one weekend and never came home." However, Rose claims the name was his idea. The last 'e' was excluded to avoid trademark problems with pop rock band the Weekend. In the beginning of his career, Tesfaye worked at American Apparel. Due to his anonymity, his co-workers listened to his music without knowing it was him.

In 2011, Tesfaye met music executives Wassim "Sal" Slaiby and Amir "Cash" Esmailian, with whom, along with Taylor, he founded the XO record label. On March 21, Tesfaye released his debut mixtape House of Balloons. The mixtape included production from producers Illangelo and Doc McKinney, and included the tracks produced by Rose, although he did not receive production credits. House of Balloons was named as one of ten shortlisted nominees for the 2011 Polaris Music Prize. On August 18, Tesfaye released his second mixtape Thursday, which received generally positive reviews. His third mixtape, Echoes of Silence, was released on December 21. It was a longlisted nominee for the 2012 Polaris Music Prize.

In July 2011, Tesfaye held his first live performance at the Mod Club Theatre in Toronto. After the performance, Drake met with Tesfaye to discuss collaborations, which led to Tesfaye earning an appearance at his OVO Festival. He also participated in concerts hosted by the Black Student Association at the University of Toronto. Tesfaye contributed to four songs on Drake's second studio album Take Care, which was released on November 15, as a songwriter, producer and a featured artist on the album's seventh single "Crew Love".

2012–2014: Trilogy and Kiss Land

Between January and March 2012, Tesfaye performed at several Ontario universities, including Waterloo's Laurier University, Hamilton's Mohawk College and McMaster University. In April, he began his first international tour; which included performances at Coachella, sold-out shows at such venues as the Bowery Ballroom in New York City, which were positively reviewed by Rolling Stone, and various European festivals, including Primavera Sound in Spain and Portugal, and the Wireless Festival in the United Kingdom. In September, Tesfaye signed with Republic Records and XO was assumed as a subsidiary label. In september, he also began his first official concert tour: The Fall Tour, during which he opened for Florence and the Machine on their Ceremonials Tour in 5 cities, which included 2 shows at the iconic Hollywood Bowl in Los Angeles.

On November 13, 2012, Tesfaye released Trilogy, a compilation album consisting of re-mixed and remastered versions of his 2011 mixtapes and three additional tracks. The album officially credited Rose as a producer and writer on the three songs from House of Balloons for which he did not initially receive credit. Trilogy debuted at number four on the US Billboard 200 with first-week sales of 86,000 copies. It also debuted at number five on the Canadian Albums Chart, with similar sales. The album was later certified platinum by the Recording Industry Association of America (RIAA) and double-platinum by Music Canada. It also earned Tesfaye a nomination for the Sound of 2013 poll award by BBC.

On May 17, 2013, Tesfaye released the title track to his debut studio album Kiss Land, and announced the album's release date of September 10. Upon release, the album debuted at number two on the Billboard 200 with 96,000 copies, and received generally positive reviews from music critics. The album was later supported by the singles "Belong to the World", "Love in the Sky" and "Live For" featuring Drake. Tesfaye embarked on a fall tour from September 6 to November 26. As of August 2015, the album had sold 273,000 copies in the United States. On August 10, 2020, almost seven years after its release, Kiss Land reached number one on the iTunes R&B chart.

In November 2013, Tesfaye opened for Justin Timberlake on The 20/20 Experience World Tour. He then contributed to the soundtrack for The Hunger Games: Catching Fire (2013), on the songs "Devil May Cry" and "Elastic Heart" with Sia and Diplo, the latter serving as the second single from the soundtrack.

In February 2014, Tesfaye remixed Beyoncé's single "Drunk in Love" from her eponymous studio album. Retaining the theme and concept of the song, he detailed the synopsis through a male's perspective. On August 25, Tesfaye collaborated with Ariana Grande on the song "Love Me Harder" from Grande's second studio album My Everything. The song was then released on September 30 as the fourth single from the album, and peaked at number seven on the Billboard Hot 100.

Tesfaye's first headlining tour, the King of the Fall Tour, a 4-city tour of North America was held in September and October 2014, and was supported by Schoolboy Q and Jhené Aiko. The tour was followed by release of the songs "Often" and "King of the Fall", leading to speculation that the former was the lead single from his second studio album, Beauty Behind the Madness (2015). On December 23, Tesfaye released the song "Earned It" from the soundtrack for Fifty Shades of Grey (2015). The single, which peaked at number three on the Billboard Hot 100, earned Tesfaye his first Academy Award nomination for Best Original Song. The song won Best R&B Performance and was nominated for Best R&B Song and Best Song Written for Visual Media at the 58th Annual Grammy Awards.

2015–2017: Beauty Behind the Madness and Starboy

On May 27, 2015, Tesfaye released the second single from Beauty Behind the Madness, "The Hills". The single debuted at number twenty on the Billboard Hot 100, and peaked at number one, becoming Tesfaye's first number-one single. In June 2019, "The Hills" was certified diamond by the RIAA, marking Tesfaye's first diamond-certified record.

In June 2015, after winning the Centric Award at the BET Awards, Tesfaye performed "Earned It" with Alicia Keys. On June 8, he released the song "Can't Feel My Face" as the album's third single. The track was previously leaked in May, but was released as a single following a performance by Tesfaye at the Apple Worldwide Developers Conference. The single debuted at number twenty-four on the Billboard Hot 100, and peaked at number one, making it Tesfaye's third top 10 hit and his second number-one song in the United States. The song was nominated for Record of the Year and Best Pop Solo Performance at the 58th Annual Grammy Awards. He occupied all three slots on Billboard's Hot R&B/Hip-Hop Songs chart simultaneously with the aforementioned singles, becoming the first artist in history to accomplish this. He was also unveiled as one of the musical faces of the streaming service Apple Music, alongside Drake. During the 2015 MTV Video Music Awards, Apple debuted a two-part promotional commercial featuring Tesfaye, which had a guest appearance from John Travolta. In July, Tesfaye headlined the inaugural FVDED in the Park festival in Surrey, British Columbia. On June 29, Tesfaye was featured on Meek Mill's second studio album Dreams Worth More Than Money (2015), on the track "Pullin' Up".

Beauty Behind the Madness, Tesfaye's second studio album, was released on August 28, 2015, and debuted atop the Billboard 200, earning 412,000 album-equivalent units in its first week. It reached the top 10 in over ten countries and reached number one in Canada, Australia, Norway, and the United Kingdom. The album was promoted by Tesfaye headlining various summer music festivals, including Lollapalooza, the Hard Summer Music Festival, and the Bumbershoot Festival. He announced The Madness Fall Tour, his first large-scale tour across the United States, which began in November, and concluded in December. The album was certified double platinum in the U.S., and sold 1.5 million copies worldwide. It was the most-streamed album in 2015, with over 60 million streams, and was ranked on multiple lists of albums of the year. The three singles that preceded the album were certified platinum in the United States. The album won Best Urban Contemporary Album and was nominated for Album of the Year at the 58th Annual Grammy Awards.

On September 4, 2015, Tesfaye was featured on Travis Scott's debut album Rodeo, on the track "Pray 4 Love". On October 10, Tesfaye appeared on Saturday Night Live alongside actress Amy Schumer, performing as the show's musical guest. This was his first performance on the show as a solo artist, after appearing with Ariana Grande to perform "Love Me Harder".In November, he began his debut arena tour, The Madness Fall Tour, which included shows at Toronto's Air Canada Centre and New York City's Madison Square Garden. On December 18, Tesfaye was featured on Belly's single "Might Not" from his eighth mixtape Up For Days.

On February 14, 2016, Tesfaye was featured on Kanye West's seventh studio album The Life of Pablo on the track "FML". It marked their second collaboration, with West previously writing and producing on Tesfaye's single "Tell Your Friends" from Beauty Behind the Madness. On March 1, Tesfaye was featured on Future's single "Low Life" from his fourth studio album Evol. On April 23, he was featured on Beyoncé's sixth studio album Lemonade on the track "6 Inch". On August 26, Tesfaye was featured on Cashmere Cat's single "Wild Love" with Francis and the Lights, which served as the lead single from Cashmere Cat's debut studio album 9 (2017).

In September 2016, Tesfaye announced that his third studio album, Starboy, would be released on November 25, and included collaborations with former French electronic music duo Daft Punk. He released the album's title track, which featured Daft Punk on September 21. The song debuted at number 40 on the Billboard Hot 100, and peaked at number one, making it Tesfaye's third number-one single. As of March 2023, the song is certified Diamond by the RIAA. Their second collaboration, "I Feel It Coming" was released on November 24. The single peaked at number four on the Billboard Hot 100. On October 1, Tesfaye made a second appearance on Saturday Night Live as the musical guest alongside actress Margot Robbie. During the show, he performed "Starboy" and "False Alarm". On November 23, he released the short film M A N I A. Directed by Grant Singer, it featured excerpts from the album, including snippets from "All I Know" featuring Future, "Sidewalks" featuring Kendrick Lamar, "Secrets" and "Die for You". Upon release, the album debuted at number one on the U.S. Billboard 200 with 348,000 units, making it Tesfaye's second consecutive number-one album. As of January 2019, the album is certified triple platinum by the RIAA. The album won Best Urban Contemporary Album at the 60th Annual Grammy Awards, making it Tesfaye's second win in the category.

On February 17, 2017, the Weeknd began his fifth concert tour, called Starboy: Legend of the Fall Tour. The tour was in support of his third studio album Starboy (2016) and concluded on December 14, 2017. He visited the continents Europa, North- and South America and Oceania. On February 15, 2017, Tesfaye was featured on Nav's commercial debut single "Some Way", which also served as the lead single from his self-titled mixtape. On February 24, he appeared on Future's sixth studio album Hndrxx, on the song "Comin Out Strong". On April 19, Tesfaye appeared on the title track and second single from Lana Del Rey's fifth studio album. On August 15, he was featured on French Montana's track "A Lie", the third single from his second studio album Jungle Rules. He then appeared on the Virgil Abloh-directed music video for Lil Uzi Vert's "XO Tour Llif3" alongside Nav. He was later featured on Lil Uzi Vert's debut album Luv Is Rage 2 on the track "UnFazed" and on Gucci Mane's eleventh studio album Mr. Davis on the track "Curve".

2018–2020: My Dear Melancholy, and After Hours

On February 2, 2018, Tesfaye contributed to the soundtrack for Black Panther on the song "Pray for Me" with Kendrick Lamar. The track served as the third single from the soundtrack, and peaked at number seven on the Billboard Hot 100.

On March 30, 2018, Tesfaye released his debut extended play My Dear Melancholy, after news of the project were teased and leaked. The EP debuted at number one on the Billboard 200 with 169,000 units, making it Tesfaye's third consecutive number-one album and the shortest album, by track count, to top the chart in eight years. On April 6, Tesfaye released the EP's lead single "Call Out My Name", which peaked at number four on the Billboard Hot 100. On April 13, he headlined the Coachella Valley Music and Arts Festival for the first time.

On June 6, 2018, Tesfaye announced his new Apple Music 1 radio show Memento Mori. The first episode was released two days later. On November 21, he released his first greatest hits album The Weeknd in Japan. In support of the album and his EP My Dear Melancholy, he began his sixth concert tour, the Weeknd Asia Tour. The tour began on November 30, 2018, and concluded on December 18, 2018. Tesfaye did six shows in Asia. On January 11, 2019, Tesfaye was featured on Gesaffelstein's song "Lost in the Fire", the second single from his second studio album Hyperion. On April 18, he released "Power Is Power" with SZA and Travis Scott, the lead single from the Game of Thrones-inspired soundtrack.

On November 24, 2019, Tesfaye teased his single "Blinding Lights" through a Mercedes-Benz commercial. On November 27, he released "Heartless" as the lead single from his fourth studio album. The song debuted at number thirty-two on the Billboard Hot 100 and peaked at number one, making it Tesfaye's fourth number-one single. "Blinding Lights" was released two days after the release of "Heartless" on November 29. The single debuted at number eleven on the Billboard Hot 100 and peaked at number one, making it Tesfaye's fifth number-one single. "Blinding Lights" would then go on to become the first song in the chart's history to hold a spot in the top ten for an entire year. It also became the longest charting song on the Hot 100 of all-time at 90 weeks, ending the week of September 11, 2021. On November 23, 2021, "Blinding Lights" was ranked as the #1 Greatest Hot 100 Hit of All Time by Billboard, surpassing "The Twist" by Chubby Checker. On January 1, 2023 it became the most streamed song on Spotify with 3.3 billion streams. 

On February 19, 2020, Tesfaye revealed that his fourth studio album would be titled After Hours, and would be released on March 20. He also released the album's title track as a promotional single. On March 7, he made his third appearance as a musical guest on Saturday Night Live, alongside actor Daniel Craig. On the show, he performed "Blinding Lights" and debuted the track "Scared to Live". Tesfaye released the album's third single "In Your Eyes" on March 24. The track peaked at number sixteen on the Billboard Hot 100.

Upon release, After Hours debuted atop the Billboard 200, earning 444,000 units, marking Tesfaye's fourth consecutive number-one album. It became the most streamed R&B album of all-time, surpassing Tesfaye's own Starboy. In the album's first charting week, Tesfaye also became the first artist to lead the Billboard 200, Billboard Hot 100, Billboard Artist 100, Hot 100 Songwriters and Hot 100 Producers charts simultaneously, and repeated his lead the following week. The deluxe version of After Hours was released on March 29, 2020, and contained the tracks "Nothing Compares", "Missed You" and "Final Lullaby".

On August 7, 2020, Tesfaye was featured on the late Juice Wrld's single "Smile" from his first posthumous album Legends Never Die. On August 28, he was featured on Calvin Harris' single "Over Now". On October 30, Tesfaye appeared on Ariana Grande's song "Off the Table" from her sixth studio album Positions. On the same day, he appeared on Oneohtrix Point Never's track "No Nightmares" from his ninth studio album Magic Oneohtrix Point Never, which he also executive produced with OPN. On November 5, he appeared on the remix of Maluma's "Hawái", was nominated for Best Urban Fusion/Performance at the 22nd Annual Latin Grammy Awards. Later that month, he debuted three live performances on Vevo. On December 10, he performed at iHeartRadio's Jingle Ball.

2021–present: Super Bowl LV halftime show, Dawn FM and collaborations

On February 5, 2021, Tesfaye released his second greatest hits album The Highlights. The album debuted at number two on the US Billboard 200, making it Tesfaye's highest charting compilation album and the biggest first week debut for a greatest hits album since Fully Loaded: God's Country (2019).

Tesfaye headlined the Super Bowl LV halftime show on February 7, 2021, becoming the first Canadian solo artist to headline the show. He reportedly spent US$7 million of his own money on the Super Bowl performance. Reviews of the performance were mixed. The show resulted in a surge in streaming and downloads for Tesfaye's After Hours album as well as for the seven other songs he performed. The halftime show earned three nominations at the 73rd Primetime Emmy Awards: Outstanding Variety Special (Live), Outstanding Lighting Design/Lighting Direction for a Variety Special, and Outstanding Technical Direction, Camerawork, Video Control for a Special.

In March 2021, Tesfaye reissued his debut mixtape House of Balloons in its authentic form with the original mixes and samples to celebrate the tenth anniversary of its release. In a collaboration with architect Daniel Arsham, limited edition merchandise was also released alongside the reissue. Six months later, in August, Tesfaye reissued his second 2011 mixtape Thursday to celebrate the tenth anniversary of its release. Like House of Balloons, limited edition merchandise was released to accompany the reissue, designed by artist Mr. Yanen. Four months later, in December, Tesfaye reissued his final 2011 mixtape Echoes of Silence to celebrate the tenth anniversary of its release. Following the earlier two mixtapes, limited edition merchandise was released alongside the reissue, designed by illustrator Hajime Sorayama. Tesfaye began to tease new music in May 2021. When asked about a new album during an interview with Variety, he explained that "if the last record is the After Hours of the night, then The Dawn is coming". On May 11, Tesfaye performed "Save Your Tears" at the Brit Awards. He also accepted his first Brit Award for International Male Solo Artist, which was presented to him by former first lady of the United States Michelle Obama. On May 24, Tesfaye performed "Save Your Tears" at the Billboard Music Awards. He was nominated for a record sixteen awards, and won ten, including Top Artist and Top Hot 100 Song. When accepting his awards, Tesfaye continued to tease new music by saying "the After Hours are done, and The Dawn is coming". On May 28, he performed the remix of "Save Your Tears" at the iHeartRadio Music Awards with Ariana Grande. On June 25, Tesfaye appeared on Doja Cat's single "You Right" from her third studio album Planet Her. On July 22, he appeared on Belly's single "Better Believe" with Young Thug from his third studio album See You Next Wednesday.

On August 2, 2021, Tesfaye released a snippet of new music on social media. Later that day, he covered the September 2021 issue of GQ, marking the magazine's first global publication. Then, in a collaboration with NBC Sports and the 2020 Summer Olympics, Tesfaye announced his single "Take My Breath", which was released on August 6. Later that month, he appeared on Kanye West's tenth studio album Donda on the track "Hurricane", which won Best Melodic Rap Performance at the 64th Annual Grammy Awards.

On October 4, 2021, during an episode of Memento Mori, Tesfaye revealed that his fifth studio album is complete and that he was waiting on a "couple characters that are key to the narrative." He also revealed that he will be featured in a couple of songs that will arrive prior to the album's release. On October 18, Tesfaye announced that his upcoming tour, originally titled The After Hours Tour, will be held entirely in stadiums due to arena constraints and is now scheduled to commence in July 2022. The tour was renamed as the After Hours til Dawn Tour, and will incorporate elements from his fourth and fifth studio albums. The Weeknd is currently on tour in North America, and will visit the continents South America, Europe, Asia, Africa, the Middle East and the country Australia.

On October 22, 2021, Tesfaye appeared on Swedish House Mafia's single "Moth To A Flame" from their debut studio album Paradise Again. On November 5, he appeared on Post Malone's single "One Right Now" from his fourth studio album Twelve Carat Toothache. On November 11, he was featured on Rosalía's single "La Fama" from her third studio album Motomami. On December 16, Tesfaye was featured on FKA Twigs' single "Tears in the Club" from her debut mixtape Caprisongs. The next day, on December 17, he was featured on Aaliyah's single "Poison" from her posthumous album Unstoppable.

Tesfaye released his fifth studio album Dawn FM on January 7, 2022. Upon release, the album debuted at number two on the Billboard 200 with 148,000 units, marking Tesfaye's eighth top ten entry and his second non-consecutive album to debut at number two. He also broke the record for the most simultaneous entries for a male soloist on the Billboard Global 200, with twenty-four songs on the chart. In addition to "Take My Breath", Dawn FM was supported by the singles "Sacrifice" and "Out of Time". February 26, Tesfaye premiered The Dawn FM Experience, a television music special in partnership with Amazon Prime Video.

On March 20, the Weeknd played in an episode of the cartoon The Simpsons. On April 18, he headlined the Coachella Valley Music and Arts Festival for the second time, performing alongside Swedish House Mafia. On July 26, 2022, the Weeknd announced that he will host a haunted house at Universal Studios Hollywood, as part of the Universal's Halloween Horror Nights hosted every Halloween. He will style the haunted houses with aesthetic of his 2020 album After Hours and the corresponding music videos and other artworks.

His song "Nothing Is Lost (You Give Me Strength)," from the Avatar: The Way of Water Soundtrack was released on December 16, 2022.

On February 24, 2023, following months-long renewed interest in and virality of the Weeknd's 2016 song "Die for You," which began charting in 2022 and reached a peak of 6 on the Billboard Hot 100 6 years after its release, a remix of the song featuring Ariana Grande was released. This remix marks their fourth collaboration. In the Billboard Hot 100 issue dated March 11, 2023, the remix peaked at number 1, becoming both artists' seventh number one hit on the chart.

On February 27, 2023, the Weeknd became the first artist to surpass 100 million monthly listeners on Spotify.

On March 3, 2023, the Weeknd released his first live album, titled Live at SoFi Stadium. It features recordings from his HBO concert film of the same name, showcasing the last concert of the North American leg of his After Hours til Dawn Tour at SoFi Stadium.

Artistry

Influences 

Tesfaye cites Michael Jackson, Prince, and R. Kelly as his main musical inspirations. He has attributed Jackson's music as key in spurring him to be a singer, referencing the lyrics to "Dirty Diana" as an example. His high-flying vocal style was influenced by Ethiopian singers such as Aster Aweke. He grew up listening to a variety of music genres, including soul, hip hop, funk, indie rock, and post-punk. Tesfaye is heavily influenced by 1980s music, and credits the video game Grand Theft Auto: Vice City (2002) for "opening my eyes" to the music of that era. "I've always had an admiration for the era before I was born", he said in an interview for Billboard. "You can hear it as far back as my first mixtape that the '80s – Siouxsie and the Banshees, Cocteau Twins – play such a huge role in my sound."

Tesfaye has named Deftones as one of his influences during the making of House of Balloons, Thursday and Echoes of Silence. He has also cited Lana Del Rey, David Bowie, the Smiths, Bad Brains, Talking Heads, DeBarge, 50 Cent, Wu-Tang Clan, and Eminem as influences and inspirations. When Daft Punk announced their split in 2021, Tesfaye praised them during an interview with Variety, saying: "Those guys are one of the reasons I make music, so I can't even compare them to other people..."

Production and songwriting 
Tesfaye's songs are "built around a fogged, crepuscular production", and feature slow tempos, rumbling bass, and forlorn echoes. His music incorporates samples that are unconventional in R&B production, including punk, shoegaze, dream pop and alternative rock. Marc Hogan of Spin says that Tesfaye's samples tend "to draw from rock critic-approved sources, though generally ones that already share elements of his sexual menace", sampling artists such as Beach House, Siouxsie and the Banshees and Aaliyah. Tesfaye worked mostly with producers Illangelo and Doc McKinney, whom Ian Cohen of Pitchfork credits with developing "a state-of-the-art R&B template" with the artist. In concert, Tesfaye reappropriates his digitized productions with a suite-like arena rock aesthetic.

His emotional, plaintive lyrics often express feelings of hurt and deal with subject matter such as sex, drugs, and partying; this is seen especially in After Hours and House of Balloons. Hermione Hoby of The Guardian characterizes Tesfaye's songs as "narcotised-slow jams" and delineates their message as "partying is an existential experience, sex is fraught with alienation, and everything registers as unreal and unsettling." Paul MacInnes of The Guardian stated that he views Tesfaye's three mixtapes as "a rough trajectory of party, after-party and hangover." Anupa Mistry of the Toronto Standard observes throughout his mixtapes a "cast of supine, stoned zombie-women... whose legs willingly part after being plied with substances and who morph into threats only when [he is] coming down and feeling vulnerable." Tesfaye has viewed that, by singing vulgar, ignorant lyrics in an elegant, sexy way, he is paying homage to R. Kelly and Prince.

Voice and music style 
Tesfaye often sings in a falsetto register, exhibiting an enticing tone. J. D. Considine finds his singing's "tremulous quality" similar to Michael Jackson, but writes that he eschews Jackson's "strong basis in the blues" for a more Arabic-influenced melisma. Tesfaye possesses a wide light-lyric tenor vocal range, which spans over three octaves. His vocal range reaches its extreme low at the bass F (F2), and its peak high at the tenor G (G5), with a natural tessitura within the upper fourth octave. Tesfaye often makes use of his head voice to build resonance to belt out strong high notes within the fifth octave. Tesfaye's vocals have a recognizable Ethiopian characteristic. Hannah Giogis of Pitchfork notes that "his trademark vibrato, the characteristically pained whine that pervades much of Tesfaye's music, draws from a long Ethiopian musical legacy of tortured pining. Imbuing our voices with the shaky pain of loss—romantic or otherwise—is a hallmark of Ethiopian musical tradition. Tesfaye, with his staccato wails and aching nostalgia, is a young, North American addition to a dynasty of melodramatic Ethiopian singers."

Tesfaye's discography spans R&B, pop, hip hop, dance, alternative and new wave genres. His work is generally categorized as alternative R&B, due to his contributions in broadening the genre's musical palette to incorporate indie and electronic styles. Mistry writes that he "will be obsequiously praised as the future of R&B music—because Tesfaye is a black singer, not because he's making quantifiable, canonical R&B." Tesfaye shared his thoughts on the primary label during an interview with Time in 2015, stating: "Alternative R&B is in my soul. It's not going anywhere. When I put out songs from House of Balloons in 2010, people said I made R&B cool again. I'm assuming that's when the label was created. I feel honored that a good part of today's music is inspired by it, consciously or subconsciously. The only way I could have done that was to be ambitious and grand." Tesfaye's first three mixtapes; House of Balloons, Thursday and Echoes of Silence, are alternative R&B projects that draw on dream pop, post-punk and trip hop, amongst others. His debut studio album Kiss Land is categorized as R&B and dark wave. His next three albums, Beauty Behind the Madness, Starboy and After Hours, are considered R&B and pop; with Starboy utilizing heavy trap influences, and After Hours drawing on new wave and dream pop influences. Tesfaye's fifth studio album Dawn FM explores dance-pop and synth-pop genres.

Plagiarism allegations 
In December 2015, Tesfaye was sued by Cutting Edge Music, which alleged that the bassline for "The Hills" had been taken from a composition featured in the score for the 2013 science fiction film The Machine. One of the producers of the song was alleged to have sent a private Twitter message to Tom Raybould, the composer of the film's score, to tell him about the sample. In September 2018, Tesfaye and Daft Punk were sued for allegedly stealing the rhythm for "Starboy" from Ethiopian poet and singer-songwriter Yasminah. Tesfaye denied the allegations.

In April 2019, Tesfaye was sued by British trio William Smith, Brian Clover, and Scott McCulloch, who accused Tesfaye of copyright infringement from plagiarising their song "I Need to Love" in order to create his song "A Lonely Night". They sought $150,000 from Tesfaye and Belly. In August 2019, the lawsuit was dismissed via summary judgment with the option to amend, with the court ruling that they had failed to show that Tesfaye or anyone else involved in making "A Lonely Night" had access to their song or that the works were substantially similar. In September 2019, the plaintiffs filed an amended claim based on secondary infringement, which is still in litigation.

In February 2020, Tesfaye and Kendrick Lamar were sued by the now-defunct indie band Yeasayer, claiming that "Pray for Me" includes an unauthorized sample of their song "Sunrise". Later that year, Yeasayer voluntarily dismissed their lawsuit. In September 2021, Tesfaye, Nicolás Jaar, and Frank Dukes were sued for copyright infringement by producers Suniel Fox and Henry Strange, protesting that "Call Out My Name" is "strikingly [or] substantially similar, if not identical" to their 2015 track "Vibeking".

Allegations of homophobic lyrics 
In January 2019, Tesfaye was criticized for some of the lyrics in his and Gesaffelstein's single "Lost in the Fire". The second verse of the song, with the lines "You said you might be into girls, said you're going through a phase / Keeping your heart safe / Well, baby, you can bring a friend / She can ride on top your face / While I fuck you straight", were accused of being homophobic, fetishizing bisexuality, and perpetuating the falsehood that a person who identifies as being part of the LGBTQ+ community can be "turned straight". However, some listeners have suggested that the lyrics were actually referring to a sex position. Tesfaye quietly addressed the controversy in the song "Snowchild" from After Hours, with the lines "Every month another accusation / Only thing I'm phobic of is failing".

Other ventures

Acting 
Tesfaye is a cinephile, and has made numerous movie references in his music videos and teasers. On August 30, 2019, during the Telluride Film Festival, he made his acting debut in the film Uncut Gems. On March 7, 2020, during his third appearance as a musical guest on Saturday Night Live, he starred in the skit "On The Couch" with actors Kenan Thompson and Chris Redd. On May 4, he co-wrote and starred in an episode of American Dad!. In July, he voiced three characters during the 200th episode of Robot Chicken. On June 29, 2021, Tesfaye announced that he will be co-creating, co-writing, executive producing and starring in the upcoming HBO television drama series The Idol, alongside his producing partner Reza Fahim and Euphoria creator Sam Levinson. On March 20, 2022, Tesfaye voiced two characters during an episode of The Simpsons.

Business 
In 2013, Tesfaye collaborated with condom company ONE to give away limited-edition condoms at his shows during the Kiss Land Fall Tour. In November 2015, he partnered with electronic vaporizer company Pax Labs to release a limited edition vaporizer. He also collaborated with fashion designer Alexander Wang for an apparel collection. In 2016, Tesfaye became a creative collaborator and global brand ambassador for the clothing brand Puma. With the partnership, he released numerous capsule collections and hosted several pop-up retail stores.

In 2017, Tesfaye partnered with retail company H&M for their men's collection. He cut ties with the company in 2018, following a racist incident within the company. In July 2018, Tesfaye collaborated with Marvel Comics to release a comic book inspired by his third studio album Starboy. In August, he released an apparel collection in collaboration with A Bathing Ape. A second collection was released in January 2020.

In April 2019, Tesfaye became an owner and global ambassador of the esports company OverActive Media, who owns the Splyce and Overwatch League team Toronto Defiant.

On August 31, 2020, Tesfaye partnered with TD Bank to launch Black HXOUSE, an entrepreneurial initiative within the incubator HXOUSE, where he serves as a sleeping partner. On September 9, Canadian Prime Minister Justin Trudeau announced a CA$221,000,000 joint venture with HXOUSE for Black Canadian entrepreneurs.

In March 2021, Tesfaye auctioned a collection of visual artwork and an unreleased song in the form of a non-fungible token (NFT) on Nifty Gateway. In October, he joined football player Tom Brady's NFT platform Autograph as a member of their board of directors.

Philanthropy 
After being presented with a Bikila Award for Professional Excellence in 2014, Tesfaye donated CA$50,000 to the University of Toronto to fund a new course on Ge'ez, the classic language of Ethiopia. In December 2015, he worked with Ryan Seacrest's foundation to visit the Children's Hospital of Atlanta. In May 2016, during Orthodox Easter, Tesfaye donated CA$50,000 to the St. Mary Ethiopian Orthodox Tewahedo Church in Toronto, Canada, a church he attended growing up. Despite having previously worked with the Trump International Hotel and Tower in Toronto, Tesfaye cancelled a scheduled appearance on Jimmy Kimmel Live! with Belly in May 2016 due to then-presidential candidate Donald Trump being present. In August 2016, he funded a new Ethiopian studies program at the University of Toronto.

In June 2017, Tesfaye donated US$100,000 to the Suubi Health Center, a maternity and children's medical facility in Budondo, Uganda. He was inspired to support the center after learning of French Montana's work with Global Citizen and Mama Hope to help raise awareness for Suubi and the people of Uganda.

In April 2020, Tesfaye launched a line of non-medical face masks with all of the proceeds going to the MusiCares COVID-19 Relief Fund, a campaign launched by the Recording Academy to help musicians affected by the COVID-19 pandemic. In addition, Tesfaye donated US$500,000 to MusiCares and CA$500,000 to the Scarborough Health Network.

In August 2016, Tesfaye donated US$250,000 to the Black Lives Matter Global Network Foundation following numerous reports of police brutality in the United States. In May 2020, in response to the murder of George Floyd and the protests that followed, Tesfaye donated US$500,000 to the Black Lives Matter Global Network Foundation, Colin Kaepernick's Know Your Rights Camp, and the National Bail Out. He then urged other music executives, major record labels, and streaming services to donate to the cause as well.

On August 7, 2020, Tesfaye held the "Weeknd Experience", an interactive virtual concert on the social media platform TikTok that drew two million total viewers, including 275,000 concurrent viewers. The concert raised over US$350,000 for the Equal Justice Initiative. He also donated US$300,000 to Global Aid for Lebanon in support of victims of the Beirut explosion. On November 2, the University of Toronto announced that it was able to reach and surpass its fundraising goal of CA$500,000 for its Ethiopic program, which included a CA$30,000 donation from Tesfaye. In May 2021, he was among the celebrities expressing more solidarity for  civilians who died during the 2021 Israel–Palestine crisis. On September 23, Tesfaye was honored with the Quincy Jones Humanitarian Award at the inaugural Music in Action Awards, which was presented by the Black Music Action Coalition.

WFP ambassadorship 
On April 4, 2021, Tesfaye announced a US$1,000,000 donation through the United Nations World Food Programme (WFP) to relief efforts in Ethiopia for people affected by the Tigray War. On June 9, he met with the administrator of the United States Agency for International Development, Samantha Power, to discuss the humanitarian crisis of the Tigray War. During the meeting, Tesfaye was briefed on the latest developments and discussed ways of increasing public pressure so direct action can be made to help civilians. Tesfaye was appointed as a UN Goodwill Ambassador for the World Food Programme on October 7. On March 3, 2022, he partnered with the WFP to launch the XO Humanitarian Fund. Through the fund, Tesfaye will donate US$1 from every ticket sold at his After Hours til Dawn Tour, in addition to a US$500,000 donation, to the WFP.

Personal life 
Tesfaye is known to be very enigmatic, and prefers to keep his personal life out of the public eye. In the beginning of his career, he refrained from participating in interviews and instead chose to communicate via Twitter, which he attributed to shyness and insecurities. To this day, he is still adamant about not participating in interviews, only agreeing to be interviewed in rare situations.

From April 2015 to August 2019, Tesfaye was in an on-again, off-again relationship with American model Bella Hadid. She starred in the music video for his single "In the Night" in December 2015. He briefly dated American singer-actress Selena Gomez from January to October 2017. Both of the relationships received widespread media attention, and were the topic of tabloid speculation.

Tesfaye's hairstyle, which has been described as one of his most recognizable traits, has been claimed to be partly inspired by American artist Jean-Michel Basquiat. He began growing it out in 2011 and remarked at how easy it was to maintain with "a hard shampoo every once in a while". He cut his hair in 2016, prior to the release of Starboy. On social media, Tesfaye typically suffixed his first name with "xo", which is often used as an emoticon for hugs and kisses. According to The Guardian Hermione Hoby, this was his intention, though others believe it was a reference to his recreational use of ecstasy and oxycodone. He later altered the handles on his social media to reflect his stage name in preparation for the release of Starboy.

In January 2015, Tesfaye was arrested for allegedly punching a police officer in Las Vegas after being taken into an elevator to break up a fight. He pleaded no contest and was sentenced to complete fifty hours of community service.

As of August 2021, Tesfaye resides in Bel Air, Los Angeles. In 2017, he purchased a home in Hidden Hills, California for $18.5 million, which he sold to Madonna in 2021 for $19.3 million. Tesfaye previously lived in penthouses in Westwood, Los Angeles and New York City.

Accolades

Tesfaye has won four Grammy Awards, a Latin Grammy Award, twenty Billboard Music Awards, six American Music Awards, two MTV Video Music Awards and twenty-two Juno Awards. He has also received nominations for an Academy Award and a Primetime Emmy Award.

In October 2014, Tesfaye was awarded the Allan Slaight Honour by Canada's Walk of Fame for "making a positive impact in the fields of music, film, literature, visual or performing arts, sports, innovation or philanthropy".

In February 2021, the Mayor of Toronto John Tory announced that the city would observe February 7 as "The Weeknd Day" to commemorate Tesfaye's Super Bowl halftime performance.

Discography

Studio albums
 Kiss Land (2013)
 Beauty Behind the Madness (2015)
 Starboy (2016)
 After Hours (2020)
 Dawn FM (2022)

Filmography

 Michael Jackson's Journey from Motown to Off the Wall (2016)
 Uncut Gems (2019)
 The Show (2021)
 The Weeknd: Live at SoFi Stadium (2023)
 The Idol (2023)
 Untitled Trey Edward Shults film (TBA)

Tours
Headlining
 The Fall Tour (2012)
 The Kiss Land Fall Tour (2013)
 King of the Fall Tour (2014)
 The Madness Fall Tour (2015)
 Starboy: Legend of the Fall Tour (2017)
 The Weeknd Asia Tour (2018)
 After Hours til Dawn Tour (2022–)
Supporting
 Florence and the Machine – Ceremonials Tour (2012)
 Justin Timberlake – The 20/20 Experience World Tour (2013)
 Drake – Would You Like a Tour? (2014)

Touring members
 Patrick Greenaway – lead guitar (2012–present), synthesizer (2020–present)
 Ledaris "LJ" Jones – bass, keyboards (2013–present)
 Ricky Lewis – drums (2011–present)

Notes

References

External links

 

 
1990 births
Living people
21st-century Black Canadian male singers
21st-century Canadian male actors
Alternative R&B musicians
Amharic-language singers
Black Canadian filmmakers
Black Canadian male actors
Black Lives Matter people
Brit Award winners
Canadian contemporary R&B singers
Canadian dance musicians
Canadian hip hop singers
Canadian humanitarians
Canadian male singer-songwriters
Canadian male voice actors
Canadian music video directors
Canadian new wave musicians
Canadian people of Ethiopian descent
Canadian performance artists
Canadian philanthropists
Canadian pop singers
Canadian record producers
Canadian tenors
French-language singers of Canada
Grammy Award winners
Juno Award for Album of the Year winners
Juno Award for Artist of the Year winners
Juno Award for Breakthrough Artist of the Year winners
Juno Award for R&B/Soul Recording of the Year winners
Juno Award for Single of the Year winners
Juno Award for Songwriter of the Year winners
Male actors from Toronto
Musicians from Toronto
People from Scarborough, Toronto
People involved in plagiarism controversies
Republic Records artists
Singers with a three-octave vocal range
XO (record label)